Drag pageantry is a developed form of pageantry for female impersonators, drag queens, and trans women, styled after traditional beauty pageants or  contests for cisgender women. It has also evolved into a pageantry for male impersonators, drag kings and trans men.

National pageants in the United States 
National drag pageants became enmeshed within the gay community during the 1960s with a national circuit of pageants organized by Flawless Sabrina and have become increasingly prevalent since. Drag pageants were held in individual gay bars, and discothèques during the post Stonewall era. Drag pageants evolved independently, in the decade subsequent to the first gay Mardi Gras coronations.

Miss Gay America 

Mirroring the format of the Miss America contest, the first national gay pageant Miss Gay America (MGA) was held in 1972 at the Watch Your Hat & Coat Saloon in Nashville, Tennessee, Nashville's first gay dance and show bar. Jerry Peek opened this bar in 1971, and it was an instant sensation, not only with gay patrons, but also with the straight crowd.  Norma Kristie, state representative of Arkansas, was crowned as the winner of the 1973 Miss Gay America Pageant, and in 1975 Norman "Norma Kristie" Jones took ownership of the pageant from Jerry Peek, who founded the Miss Gay America Pageant.  Norman Jones would form Norma Kristie, Inc. and operate the pageant and its network of preliminaries for the next 30 years.

Since its inception, MGA has prided itself as a showcase for pure female impersonation: Contestants must be men who live as men, achieving a convincing feminine illusion solely through their own ingenuity, creativity, and resourcefulness. Bodily feminization via female hormones, breast implants, and/or injectable fillers such as liquid silicone is strictly forbidden (plastic surgery and fillers above the neck are permitted, however). An interview in male attire is a key component of the pageant; contestants are judged not only for their poise and articulateness but for their overall masculine presentation—points may be deducted for feminine aspects such as overly plucked eyebrows or long fingernails.

In February 2005, the Miss Gay America pageantry system was purchased by Larry Tyger and Terry Eason of L & T Entertainment. Currently, contestants are judged in 5 categories: Male Interview, Solo Talent, Evening Gown, Stage Question & Answer, and Production Talent.

On February 4, 2016, Michael Dutzer and Rob Mansman of Mad Angel Entertainment purchased the Miss Gay America pageant From L & T Entertainment.

Former titleholders 

 *1 Lady Baronessa's full name was "The Lady Baroness Maria Andrea del Santiago."
 *2 Shan Covington had his title revoked for conduct unbecoming a Miss Gay America titleholder.  The title was offered to the 1976 First Alternate, Michael Andrews, who passed it up because he wanted to win the title.  The title was then passed to the 1976 Second Alternate, Dani Daletto.  Dani Daletto was crowned in a special ceremony at the 1976 Miss Gay South Pageant held at Vapors Nightclub in Hot Springs, AR.
 *3 Ramona LeGer' died 5 months into his reign.  1995 First Alternate, Patti Le Plae Safe, requested not to be crowned or wear the crown during the pageant year in Ramona's memory.  Patti La Plae Safe served as the official Miss Gay America Representative, until the night of the 1996 Miss Gay America Pageant, at which he was finally crowned the official 1995 Miss Gay America in a special ceremony.
 *4 Alyssa had his title revoked due to scheduling conflicts with previous engagements and his Miss Gay America duties.  The title was passed to the 2010 First Alternate, Coco Montrese, who was crowned in a special ceremony at The Grey Fox Nightclub in St. Louis, MO.
 *5 Coti Collins was the longest competing Miss Gay America winner.  His first appearance at Miss Gay America was in 1988 as the First Alternate from the Miss Gay West Virginia America franchise.

Miss Continental

As Miss Gay America grew in popularity and prestige, many professional female impersonators who lived full-time as women found they were unable to compete in the pageant due to its longstanding rule barring transgender contestants. Aside from the prestige of holding a national title, MGA afforded its winner guaranteed show bookings at every state preliminary held during the title year; thus, the MGA crown turned what was often local, part-time work into a full-time job. Because many trans women also use drag shows as a source of income, it was only natural that a pageantry system would evolve to meet their needs.

In 1980, Chicago nightclub promoter Jim Flint, owner of the Baton Show Lounge, filled this void with the creation of the Miss Continental U.S.A. Pageant. Contestants were scored in interview, swim wear, talent, and evening gown; for the finalists, an on stage question. A number of notable winners either were "boy queens" at the time that they won or have never pursued gender transition—including Chilli Pepper, the first Miss Continental, Michelle Dupree, Miss Continental 1998, Naysha Lopez, Miss Continental, 2013 and Brooke Lynn Hytes, Miss Continental 2014–15—but over time the Continental Pageantry System became renowned for its "titty girls," or pre-/non-operative transsexual contestants. On January 7, 2019 Jim Flint released a statement that Continental would be the second pageant out of the top 5 to allow post-operative contestant to compete in its pageants, the only other National System that allowed that until this time was All American Goddess. Today, Miss Continental has preliminaries representing various U.S. states as well as Canada and Europe.

(All winners were crowned in Chicago, Illinois)

In 2019, Jim Flint, owner of the Continental Pageant announced that long time competitor Sasha Valentino would be named an HONORARY Miss Continental.  Sasha passed away 12/26/2011.

Miss Continental Plus Winners
 1991 - Ginger Grant (Deceased)
 1992 - Denise Russell
 1993 - The Lady Catiria Reyes (Deceased)
 1994 - Erica Christian
 1995 - Carmella Marcella Garcia (Deceased)
 1996 - Victoria LePaige
 1997 - Dena Cass
 1998 - Santana T. Summers (Deceased)
 1999 - Terri Williams
 2000 - Tumara Mahorning
 2001 - Angel Sherdian
 2002 - Chevelle Brooks
 2003 - Victoria Parker
 2004 - Angelica Sanchez
 2005 - Amaya
 2006 - Desiree Demornay
 2007 - Tajma Hall (Deceased)
 2008 - Mercedes Tyler
 2009 - CoCo Van Cartier
 2010 - Roxxxy Andrews
 2011 - Chelsea Pearl (Deceased)
 2012 - Tanisha Cassadine (Deceased)
 2013 - Whitney Paige (Deceased)
 2013 - Farra N. Hyte (Succeeded)
 2014 - Tahjee Iman
 2015 - Kofi
 2016 - Natasha Douglas
 2017 - KeKe Velazquez-Lord
 2018 - Chy’enne Valentino
 2019 - Darcel Stevens
 2019 - Ivy White - HONORARY* (Deceased)
 2020 - No pageant due to COVID-19
 2021 - Britney Taylor
 2022 - Rachel Meredith

Miss Continental Elite Winners
 2004 - Nikki Adams
 2005 - Barbra Herr
 2006 - Maya Douglas
 2007 - Danielle Hunter
 2008 - Angel Sheridan
 2009 - Michelle Fighter
 2010 - Electra
 2011 - Daesha Richards
 2012 - Dana Douglas
 2013 - Kourtney Van Wales
 2014 - Lady Charisse Estrada (Deceased)
 2015 - Chantel Reshae
 2016 - Teryl Lynn Foxx
 2017 - Fontasia L'Amour
 2018 - Lorna Vando
 2018 - Misty Knight *HONORARY (Deceased)
 2019 - A'zsia Dupree
 2020 - Ginger Manchester *HONORARY (Deceased)
 2020 - No pageant due to COVID-19
 2021 - Yosmein Cambell Starr
 2022 - Layla Larue

Mr. Continental Winners
 2004 - Carl Harris (Dethroned)
 2004 - Ray Matthews
 2005 - Antonio Edwards
 2006 - Tony Desario
 2007 - Simba Hall
 2008 - Rasean Montrese
 2009 - David "Freklz" Hunter
 2010 - Christopher Iman
 2011 - Nick Gray
 2012 - Phillip Alexander
 2013 - Angel Saez Amador
 2014 - Kalil Valentino
 2015 - Joey Taylor
 2016 - Mykul Jay Valentine
 2017 - Antwuan Steele
 2018 - Ramon Ventura
 2019 - Sir' Valentino
 2020 - Desi M. Andrews
 2021 - No pageant due to COVID-19
 2022 - Prince Travi
 2023 - Syvon Sinatra Sanchez

National Entertainer of the Year 

This contest was created by George Stinson and Ed Lewis, owners of the successful Connection Complex in Louisville, Kentucky. They drew their inspiration from Female Impersonator of the Year, a one-time pageant event held in Houston in 1985, hosted by Ruth Buzzi and Lyle Waggoner, and released as a cable-TV special and home video. The winner of that contest, the late Naomi Sims (Newman Braud), is honored as EOY Emeritus. The headquarters for the contest was also in the Connection.

Mr. Entertainer of the Year

 2002 - Carl Harris
 2003 - D'Andre
 2004 - Romeo Avila
 2005 - Rasean Montrese
 2006 - William Benion
 2007 - Monte St. James
 2008 - Savion Simpson (Deceased)
 2009 - Xavier Valentino Litter
 2010 - Alex Stabler
 2011 - Mykul Jay Valentine
 2012 - Xavier Cole
 2013 - David "Freklz" Hunter
 2014 - Matthew Jay Kelly
 2015 - Judas Elliot
 2016 - Rolly Villaverde
 2017 - Charlton Alicea
 2018 - Prince Travi
 2019 - Prince Cole
 2020 - No pageant due to COVID-19
 2021 - Zodiacx Iman
 2022 - Jericho Habib

King Entertainer of the Year

In 2011, after years of pushing from EOY promoters and a final agreement from major sponsor Anheuser Busch, National EOY introduced an MI division.  On a preliminary level, the first MI crowned into the EOY system was Joey Paige, who captured the title of  Kentucky EOY King at the preliminary pageant in Louisville on July 3, 2011.  This was the only EOY MI prelim contest held that year. Michigan EOY also sent a representative to Nationals that year, Spacee Kadett, though Spacee was appointed the title in the state.  The remaining contestants for the first EOY King contest entered as open competitors, and such open entry into EOY King competition continues to this day.

In July 2011, after national competition, EOY crowned Spacee Kadett as the first national king in its system. Spacee's victory and reign of outrageous drag helped push drag kinging to a more daring and theatrical level across the US, and set a standard for kings in the EOY system.

Femme Entertainer of the Year

In 2015, EOY promoters and owners expanded the contest to include the Femme counterparts with the first National Pageant held at the Connection Complex theatre.

Miss Gay USofA

Houston, Texas based MGA promoter Jerry Bird purchased the bankrupt Miss Gay USA pageant from former MGA Jimi Dee in 1985. Within a few years he took the pageant from a small twelve contestant affair to a national showcase with over eighty participants. In 1986, the first Miss Gay USA Naomi Sims crowned Michael Andrews. In the mid-1990s the pageant was renamed Miss Gay USofA after complaints and legal threats from the owner of Miss USA, Donald Trump, who placed a cease and desist order until verbiage could be agreed upon that allowed for both competitions to continue without confusion or discrimination.

There have been a wide range of contestants in the Miss USofA System, and many USofA titleholders also count the Miss Gay America crown as accomplishments in female impersonation.  These include:

Naomi Sims, Miss Gay USA 1979 (Miss Gay America 1985);
Michael Andrews, Miss Gay USA 1986 (Miss Gay America 1977);
Jacquelyn DeVaroe, Miss Gay USofA 1997 (Miss Gay America 1994);
Lauren Taylor, Miss Gay USofA 1998 (Miss Gay America 1997);
Alyssa Edwards, Miss Gay USofA 2006 (Miss Gay America 2010, though Edwards was stripped of the title a few short months after winning the crown);
Dominique Sanchez, Miss Gay USofA 2010 (Miss Gay America 2003); Luscious, Miss Gay USofA 2011 (Miss Gay America 2007), and, Asia O'Hara, Miss Gay USofA 2007 (Miss Gay America 2016).

The following is the list of the winners of the Miss Gay U.S.A. Pageant — then a complete change of ownership — Miss Gay USA winners 1986 through 1994 and Miss Gay USofA winners from 1995 through present:

Miss Gay USofA

Miss Gay USofA at Large
1989 - Carmella Marcella Garcia - Deceased
1990 - Denise Russell
1991 - Jeana Jones
1992 - Nancy Newton
1993 - Jaqueline St. James - Crowned at Club Cabaret in Hickory, NC
1994 - Maxi Houston - Deceased
1995 - Chelsea Pearl - Crowned in Dayton, OH - Deceased
1996 - Stacey Holliday
1997 - Whitney Paige - Crowned at Club Cabaret in Hickory, NC - Deceased
1998 - Dena Cass
1999 - Victoria LePaige - Crowned in Indianapolis, IN
2000 - Kofi - Crowned in Houston, TX 
2001 - Niesha Dupree- Crowned at Club Odyssey in Winston-Salem, NC
2002 - Alicia Markstone
2003 - Kelexis Davenport-Crowned at Village Station (Station 4) Dallas, TX
2004 - Kitty Litter-Crowned at Throckmorton Mining Company- Dallas, TX
2005 - Raven St. James - Crowned at The Rose Room (Village Station) in Dallas, TX
2006 - Kathryn York - Crowned at Inergy in Houston, TX
2007 - Mahogany Knight - Crowned at the Saint in San Antonio, TX
2008 - Tajma Hall - Crowned at the Saint in San Antonio, TX - Deceased
2009 - April Reign - Crowned at Talbott Street in Indianapolis, IN
2010 - Tahjee Iman - Crowned at The Honey Pot in Tampa, FL
2011 - Desiree DeMornay - Crowned at the Honey Pot in Tampa, FL
2012 - Dorae Saunders - Crowned at The Parliament House in Orlando, FL
2013 - Angelica Sanchez - Crowned at The Parliament House in Orlando, FL
2014 - Danielle DeLong - Crowned at The Parliament House in Orlando, FL
2015 - Ka'aliyah McKim Diamond - Crowned at Axis in Columbus, OH
2016 - Sasha Lauren - Crowned at Axis in Columbus, OH
2017 - Kenya M. Black - Crowned at The Rose Room (Station 4)- Dallas, TX
2018 - Shavonna B. Brooks - Crowned at The Rose Room (Station 4) - Dallas, TX
2019 - Des'ree St. James - Crowned at The Rose Room (Station 4) - Dallas, TX
2020 - No pageant due to COVID-19
2021 - No pageant due to COVID-19
2022 - Armani Nicole Davenport - Crowned at The Rose Room (Station 4) - Dallas, TX

Miss Gay USofA Classic

2003 - Tina Devore - from Atlanta, GA - Emeritus- Deceased
2004 - Ginger Manchester - from Ft. Wayne, IN - crowned in St. Louis, MO - Deceased
2005 - Latoya Bacall - from Lexington, KY - crowned at the Rose Room in Dallas, TX
2006 - Chelsea Pearl - from Lexington, KY - crowned at the Round-Up Saloon in Dallas, TX - Deceased
2007 - Anita Mann - from Springfield, IL - crowned at the Round-Up Saloon in Dallas, TX
2008 - Shae Shae LaReese - from Laguna Beach, CA - crowned at the Round-Up Saloon in Dallas, TX
2009 - Lawanda Jackson - from Houston, TX - crowned at the Round-Up Saloon in Dallas, TX
2010 - Whitney Paige - from Little Rock, AR - crowned at the Round-Up Saloon in Dallas, TX - Deceased
2011 - Catia Lee Love - from Tulsa, OK - crowned at the Round-Up Saloon in Dallas, TX
2012 - Layla LaRue - from Dallas/San Antonio, TX - crowned at the Round-Up Saloon in Dallas, TX
2013 - Amy DeMilo - from Tampa, FL - crowned at the Round-Up Saloon in Dallas, TX
2014 - Chevelle Brooks - from Orlando, FL - crowned at the Round-Up Saloon in Dallas, TX
2015 - Roxie Hart - from Oklahoma City, OK - crowned at the Round-Up Saloon in Dallas, TX
2016 - Nancy Taylor - from Houston, TX - crowned at the Round-Up Saloon in Dallas, TX
2017 - Dominique Sanchez - from Little Rock, AR - crowned at the Round-Up Saloon in Dallas, TX
2018 - Tasha Long - from Birmingham, AL - crowned in the Rose Room at S4 in Dallas, TX
2019 - Stacey Holliday - from Hereford, TX - crowned in the Rose Room at S4 in Dallas, TX
2020 - No pageant due to COVID-19
2021 - No pageant due to COVID-19
2022 - Myah Ross Monroe - from Atlanta, GA - crowned in the Rose Room at S4 in Dallas, TX

Miss Gay USofA Newcomer

2010 - Phalon M. Steele - crowned at Talbott Street in Indianapolis, IN
2011 - Arianna Evans - crowned at the Honey Pot in Tampa, FL
2012 - Ka'aliyah McKim Diamond - crowned at Angles Events Center in Oklahoma City, OK
2013 - Tonica E. Cavalli - crowned at Angles Events Center in Oklahoma City, OK
2014 - Kira Daniels - crowned at the Park Inn Champagne Ballroom in Dallas, TX
2015 - Mari Jane - crowned at Love Field Inn and Suites Champagne Ballroom in Dallas, TX
2016 - Vanity St. James - crowned at the Round-Up Saloon in Dallas, TX
2017 - Domita Sanchez - crowned at the Round-Up Saloon in Dallas, TX
2018 - Eva DeLeon - crowned at the Round-Up Saloon in Dallas, TX
2019 - Alexxa Oasis - crowned at the Round-Up Saloon in Dallas, TX
2020 - No pageant due to COVID-19
2021 - No pageant due to COVID-19
2022 - Stacie Alexis Davenport - crowned at The Rose Room (Station 4) - Dallas, TX (Stepped down)
2022 - Sapphire Davenport - Crowned at The Rose Room (Station 4) - Dallas, TX (Succeeded)

Mr. Gay USofA

2008 - Ram Crawford - crowned at the Saint in San Antonio, TX
2009 - Simba Hall - crowned at the Saint in San Antonio, TX
2010 - David "Freklz" Hunter - crowned at the Saint in San Antonio, TX
2011 - GQ - crowned at Club Crystal in Houston, TX
2012 - Rasean Montrese - crowned at Club Crystal in Houston, TX
2013 - Christopher Iman - crowned at the Saint in San Antonio, TX
2014 - Jeffrey Kelly - crowned at the Saint in San Antonio, TX
2015 - Michael LaMasters - crowned at the Heat in San Antonio, TX
2016 - Desi M. Andrews - crowned at the Round-Up Saloon in Dallas, TX
2017 - Dione Kelly - crowned at Rich's in Houston, TX
2018 - Angel - crowned at Rich's in Houston, TX
2019 - Roman Tajoure - crowned at The Rose Room (Station 4) - Dallas, TX
2020 - No pageant due to COVID-19
2021 - Ky'Ron Iman Dickerson - crowned at The Rose Room (Station 4) - Dallas, TX
2022 - Q Dominican Sanchez - crowned at Club Crystal - Houston, TX

Mr. Gay USofA at Large
2008 - Samson - crowned at the Saint in San Antonio, TX
2009 - Seymour Chilton - crowned at the Saint in San Antonio, TX
2010 - Ty Juan Davis - crowned at the Saint in San Antonio, TX
2011 - Felix "Big Fee" Correa - crowned at Club Crystal in Houston, TX
2012 - Nikko Andrews - crowned at Club Crystal in Houston, TX
2013 - O'Dey D. Brooks - crowned at The Heat in San Antonio, TX
2014 - Zayer York - crowned at the Heat in San Antonio, TX
2015 - Kane Connors - crowned at the Heat in San Antonio, TX
2016 - Dakota Whitney - crowned at the Round-Up Saloon in Dallas, TX
2017 - Ade' Tajoure - crowned at Rich's in Houston, TX
2018 - RyYon Tajoure - crowned at Rich's in Houston, TX
2019 - La’Darius Mirage Jackson - Crowned at The Rose Room (Station 4) - Dallas, TX
2020 - No pageant due to COVID-19
2021 - Lil Nugg - crowned at The Rose Room (Station 4) - Dallas, TX
2022 - JC Anthony-Crawford - crowned at Club Crystal - Houston, TX

Mister USofA MI

2008 - Xander Kinidy - crowned at Angles in Oklahoma City, OK
2009 - Richard Cranium - crowned at Angles in Oklahoma City, OK
2010 - Amedeus K. York - crowned at Angles in Oklahoma City, OK
2011 - Jordan Allen - crowned at Angles in Oklahoma City, OK
2012 - Damian Matrix - crowned at Angles in Oklahoma City, OK
2013 - Will Ryder - crowned at Angles in Oklahoma City, OK (resigned)
2013 - Ivory Onyx - replaced Will Ryder after resignation
2014 - Eazy Love - crowned in Nashville, TN
2015 - Papa Cherry-Matrix - crowned at Angles in Oklahoma City, OK
2016 - Abs Hart - crowned at Angles in Oklahoma City, OK
2017 - Eddie Broadway - crowned in Dayton, OH
2018 - D'Angelo - crowned in Dayton, OH
2019 - Dustin Riot - crowned in Dayton, OH
2020 - No pageant due to COVID-19
2021 - No pageant due to COVID-19
2022 - Brandon KC Young - crowned at Discovery Night Club in Little Rock, AR

Mister USofA MI Classic
2012 - Marc Meridian - crowned in Oklahoma City, OK
2013 - D Luv Savyion - crowned in Oklahoma City, OK
2014 - Brandon Packer - crowned in Nashville, TN
2015 - DC - crowned in Oklahoma City, OK
2016 - Valentino Rios - crowned in Oklahoma City, OK
2017 - Ivory Onyx - crowned in Dayton, OH
2018 - Ken Dartanyan - crowned in Dayton, OH
2019 - Freddy Prinze Charming - crowned in Dayton, OH
2020 - No pageant due to COVID-19
2021 - No pageant due to COVID-19
2022 - Justin Case - crowned at Discovery Night Club in Little Rock, AR

Miss USofA DIVA (femme)
2014 - Brandi Amara Skyy - crowned in Nashville, TN
2015 - Bella Nicole Harlow - crowned in Oklahoma City, OK
2016 - Victoria Rios - crowned in Oklahoma City, OK
2017 - Seduction D. Dickerson - crowned in Dayton, OH
2018 - Ruby Scott Jacquet - crowned in Dayton, OH
2019 - Glam Davenport - crowned in Dayton, OH
2020 - No pageant due to COVID-19
2021 - No pageant due to COVID-19
2022 - Khamillion Adonis Dickerson Dartanyan - crowned at Discovery Night Club in Little Rock, AR
During the 1990s, the range and variety of drag pageantry continued to expand; however the "big four" pageant systems of MGA, Continental, USofA and EOY still dominated the market. New competitions with new requirements brought a wider variety of performers to drag pageantry. Contests for plus-sized, mature and African American female impersonators became popular.

All American Goddess
This pageant system was created by Scott Gonyaw. Unlike the "Big Four" of drag pageantry, AAG welcomes postoperative trans women as contestants.  As of January 7, 2020, AAG is now promoted by former AAG, Nikki Vixxen.

2007 - Latoya Bacall
2008 - India Ferrah
2009 - Candi Stratton
2010 - Alyssa Edwards 
2011 - Alana Steele
2012 - Asia O'Hara
2013 - Brittany Moore
2014 - Sunny Dee-Lite
2015 - Dena Cass
2016 - Alexis Mateo
2017 - Antwanette Chanel Roberts
2018 - Nikki Vixxen
2019 - Tiffany T. Hunter
2020 - No pageant due to COVID-19
2021 - Olivia Rae Taylor
2022 - Kamaree Williams

All American Goddess at Large
2009 - Lawren LaMoore (Deceased)
2010 - Kelexis Davenport
2011 - Dena Cass
2012 - Whitney Paige (Deceased)
2013 - Danielle DeLong
2014 - Brooklyn Starr
2015 - Juliza T. Alezae
2016 - Kristina Kelly
2017 - Alexis Nicole Whitney
2018 - Adriana P.T. Fuentes
2019 - Sandra Onassis Lopez
2020 - Monica Moore
2021 - Lindsay Paige
2022 - Nadine Hughes

All American Gent
2013 - Monte R. St. James
2014 - Rasean Montrese
2015 - No Contest
2016 - Jose Manuel Vega
2017 - Cielo Whitney
2018 - Jeffrey Kelly
2019 - Antonio Edwards
2020 - Matthew Steele
2021 - Mykul Jay Valentine
2022 - Jovan Cardin IV

The Female Impersonators’ Miss Florida Pageant (Miss Florida FI)
First held in 1972, a few months after the first Miss Gay America contest, this pageant was revived in 2014 after seven years of inactivity. Though technically a state pageant, Miss Florida FI held prestige comparable to that of a national pageant for many years, with entertainers from around the U.S. vying for the crown, and guests and judges who included international celebrities. Before Miss Continental and Miss Gay USA (now Miss Gay USofA) were created, Miss Florida was the only major female-impersonation pageant that permitted trans women to compete. (Jim Flint, owner and founder of the Continental Pageantry System, has acknowledged Miss Florida as his inspiration for creating Miss Continental.)

1972 - Tricia Marie
1973 - Emoré DuBois
1974 - Roxanne Russell
1975 - Noly Greer
1976 - Hot Chocolate
1977 - Dana Manchester
1978 - Tiffany Arieagus
1979 - Rachaell Santoni
1980 - Tiffani Middlesexx
1981 - Nikki Adams
1982 - Dana Douglas
1983 - Victoria Lawrence
1984 - Chena Black
1985 - Amber Richards
1986 - Mahogany
1987 - Sandy Laurent
1988 - Lakesha Lucky
1989 - Shanté (Alexandra Billings) (see note below)
1990 - Chena Kelly
1991 - Bobbie Lake
1992 - Stephanie Shippae/Monica Munro (see note below)
1993 - Esmeralda Russell
1994 - Gloria Klein
1995 - Heather Fontaine
1996 - Jasmine Bonét
1997 - Electra
1998 - Erika Norell
1999 - Danielle Hunter
2000 - Amy DeMilo
2001 - Valentina
2002 - Tasha Long
2003 - Cézanne
2004 - Angelique Ali (dethroned)
2004 - Gina DiAngelo
2005 - Champagne Bordeaux
2006 - No contest
2007 - Victoria Michaels
2008–2013 - Inactive
2014 - Brittany Moore
2015 - Chasity Ross Boen
2016 - Shantell D'Marco
2017 - Kalah Mendoza
2018 - Jazell Barbie Royale
2019 - Kylee Hunter
2020 - No Contest due to Covid
2021 - Melony VonKruz
2022 - Juliana Rivera

Miss Florida FI at Large

1988 - Angel Sheridan
1989 - Joey Brooks
1990 - Andrea Lovelace
1991 - Robin Knight (dethroned), Lola Lush
1992 - Luna
1993 - Alicia Brooks
1994 - Sierrah Foxx (Deceased)
1995 - Lorrie Del Mar
1996–1999 - Inactive
2000 - Carmella Marcella Garcia (Deceased)
2001 - Nicolette Ashton
2002 - Jasmine Skiies
2003 - No contest
2004 - Jocelyn Summers
2005 - Sasha Sommers (Deceased)
2006 - No contest
2007 - TP Lords
2008–2015 - Inactive
2016 - Nicole T. Phillips
2017 - Angelica Sanchez
2018 - Noel Leon
2019 - Kimberly Venom
2020 - No Contest due to Covid
2021 - Velvet Lenore
2022 - Tayanna Love

Miss Florida FI Supreme
2018 - Dana Douglas (Emeritus)
2019 - Erika Norell
2020 - No Contest due to Covid
2021 - Kelly Anderson (Stepped down)
2021 - Joanna James (Succeeded)
2022 - Tasha Long

Mr. Florida M.E

2016 - Jose Manuel Vega (Emeritus)
2017 - Antonio Edwards
2018 - Carlos Roque
2019 - Raul Vegas
2020 - No Contest due to Covid
2021 - Gustavo G. Rivers
2022 - Rolly Villaverde

Note: In 1989, ownership of the pageant fell into dispute after its creator-owner, Keith Landon, died. An alternative pageant called Miss Florida State was held that year; Shanté (Alexandra Billings) was crowned the winner but is not officially recognized as a former Miss Florida FI. In 1992, ownership of the pageant again fell into dispute after the death of its second owner, René Rodriguez. This time, two competing pageants were held: Miss Florida FI, won by Stephanie Shippae ́, and National Miss Florida, won by Monica Munro. Monica is also unrecognized as an official former, but she walked in the Parade of Miss Floridas that opened the 2001 pageant at the invitation of the owners. Alyson Thomas became President and CEO of Miss Florida F.I. Pageanty, Inc in 2014.  Under her control, she acknowledged Shante and Monica Munro as former Miss Florida F.I.s

Universal ShowQueen
Since 1984, Universal ShowQueen has been held annually in Honolulu, Hawaii. Similar to Miss Florida FI, USQ is a "local national" pageant that attracts contestants from not only Hawaii but also the mainland U.S. It is renowned for its signature category—Showgirl Costume—a showcase for lavish and elaborate Las Vegas–style costumes and headdresses.

1984 - Linda DeCrimsen
1985 - Cher Marisa
1986 - Michelle Tomas
1987 - Yoshiko Oshiro
1988 - Whitney Carlysle
1989 - Brandy Olsen
1990 - Dina Jacobs
1991 - Coco Vaughn
1992 - Kelly Ray
1993 - Angela Carrera
1994 - Aiko
1995 - Sharee L'Amour
1996 - Cézanne
1997 - Keisha
1998 - Jacqueline
1999 - Maya Douglas
2000 - Tasha Lee
2001 - Kaina Jacobs
2002 - Raven
2003 - Zia De Zaneiro
2004 - Erica Andrews
2005 - Cassandra Colby
2006 - Raquell Lord
2007 - Maddalyn Ashton
2008 - Cocoa Chandelier
2009 - Yuni Carey
2010 - Perla Welch
2011 - DeeRanged
2012 - Christina Doll
2013 - Shalani Dante
2014 - Marina Del Rey
2015 - Jerrica Benton
2016 - Sofia Andrews
2017 - Vicky Chavarria
2018 - Alina Malletti Galore
2019 - Chevelle Brooks
2020 - No pageant due to COVID-19
2021 - No pageant due to COVID-19
2022 - Gadfrie Arbulu

Miss Gay International
(Formerly Miss Amateur National)
This pageant founded for newer queens transformed into what is now Miss International Inc. 
-This system is not to be confused with the hostile split with former's (Vicki Valentino & Marlowe Septimius) with the now defunct Miss Gay International Inc.

1999 - Christine Mancini - From Clinton, MD
2000 - Stefani Valentino - From Toledo, OH
2001 - Lady Angelica - From Akron, OH
2001 - Chelsey Clinton *honorary - From Nashville, TN ~
2002 - Jessica Spaulding - From Washington D.C. - Deceased
2003 - Starr Powers - From Harrisburg, PA
2004 - Kiarra Marlowe Fontaine - From Toledo, OH - Deceased
2005 - Miss D. Meanor - From Wilmington, DE
2006 - Monet Dupree - From Washington, D.C. ~~
2006 - Amaya Mann - From Bloomington, IL
2007 - Vicki Valentino - From St, Louis, MO
2008 - Takiya Valentino Wynters - From Atlanta, GA
2009 - Sierra Spaulding - From Newark, DE 
2010 - The Minx - From Orlando, FL
2011 - Rachel Mykels - From Austin, TX
2012 - Adora Blake - From Richmond, VA
2013 - Amanda Love - Parkersburg, WV
2014 - Danielle Revlon - From Baltimore, MD
2015 - Ivy Profen - From Charleston, WV
2016 - Pageant discontinued

~ Chelsey took over for Lady Angelica when she was temporarily dethroned.  When Anjelica was rethroned after the crowning of a new winner, Chelsey was named Honorary for her service to the pageant.

~~ Monet was initially crowned in 2006 but shortly after it was discovered there was a scoring error and Amaya had actually won.  They shared the title briefly before Monet was de-crowned for unknown reasons.

Miss Gay International Plus
1999 - Gayla DeLust
2000 - Samantha Styles
2001 - Miss Peaches
2004 - Dena Cass
2005 - Victoria Parker
2007 - Kitty Litter
2008 - Danielle Revlon
2009 - Chevelle Brooks
2010 - Adina Ronee
2011 - Pageant Was Discontinued

National Bearded Queen

In 2016 this system was founded to provide individuals who did not fit the "standard norm" of drag. National Bearded Queen is a system that provides an opportunity for Bearded Queers to compete and showcase their talents. This system is open to individuals of all genders with the only requirement to compete being they must perform regularly as a bearded performer (Real or Prosthetic).  Prelims started in 2017 with the first National Competition held in May 2018.

America's Bearded Queen 
Bearded Pageantry Inc created America's Bearded Queen in 2019 and the first national contest was held in November of 2021.  It will be held in November each year in Dallas, TX.

See also
 Ball culture
 Cross-dressing ball
 Drag (clothing)
 Drag queens
 Drag kings
 Faux queen
 Bearded Drag
 List of transgender-related topics
 List of drag queens
 RuPaul's Drag Race, a reality show with a similar premise

References

Cross-dressing culture